Honvédség is Hungarian for "homeland defence" and may refer to:

 Royal Hungarian Landwehr (1867-1918)
 Royal Hungarian Army (1920-1945)
 Hungarian Defence Force (1946-present)